In Dublin is a folk/rock album by Alan Stivell, recorded live at the National Stadium, Dublin, on 26 and 27 November 1974, and originally released in 1975.

The album was produced by Alan Stivell and Peter Rice for Keltia III. It was recorded by Frank Owen on the Island Mobile, and mixed by Howard Kilgour at Island Studios. The original LP release (in the UK, Fontana 9299 547) was cut at Apple Studios, with sleeve photography by Roy Esmonde and Ian Gwenic and design by Alain Batifoulier and Blandine Durand. Packaged with the original LP was a poster drawn by Irish artist Jim Fitzpatrick.

Track listing 
"Spered Hollvedel" (Universal Spirit) (Traditional; arranged by Stivell)
"Delivrance" (Deliverance) (Stivell)
"Ha Kompren't 'vin Erfin" (Shall I Be Understood At Last?) (Stivell)
"Tenwal Eo'r Bed" (The World Is Dark) (Words: Erwan Evenou, Music: Traditional; arranged by Stivell)
"Digor Eo An Hent" (The Road Is Clear) (Stivell)
"Debhair An Rinceoir" (Debhair The Dancer) / Jig Gwengamp (Traditional; arranged by Stivell)
"Pachpi Kozh" (Trad arr. Stivell) / Pachpi New' (Stivell)
"Laridenn / Maieseal O Neil" (Traditional; arranged by Stivell)
"Ton-Bale Pourled / Hanter-Drou Haou" (Traditional; arranged by Stivell)
"Bal Ha Dans Plinn" (Traditional; arranged by Stivell)
"An Droiou" (Traditional)

Personnel 
Alan Stivell - vocals, Celtic harp, bombarde, Irish flute, Scottish bagpipes
Dan Ar Bras - electric and acoustic guitars
René Werneer - fiddle, dulcimer
Pascal Stive - organ
Michel Santangelli - drums
Jacky Thomas - bass guitar

with

Bagad Bleimor (the Breton Pipe Band Bleimor)
Alan Kloatr - transverse flute, Breton bagpipe, bombarde
Padrig Sicard - bombarde
Mik Ar Biz - bombarde
Dominique Mollard - Scottish drums and Irish drum
Patrig Mollard - Scottish Bagpipes
Pierre Mayel - Scottish Bagpipes

Alan Stivell albums
1975 live albums
Fontana Records live albums